William Howard "Bud" Saunders (May 1, 1884 – ?) was an American football player, coach of football and basketball, and college athletics administrator.  He served as the head football coach at William Jewell College in 1911, at Haskell Institute—now Haskell Indian Nations University—from 1918 to 1919, at Grinnell College from 1920 to 1921, and at Clemson University from 1923 to 1926.  Saunders was the head basketball coach at Knox College in Galesburg, Illinois during the 1922–23 season and at Clemson from 1923 to 1925, compiling a career college basketball coaching record of 20–40.  He also served as the athletic director at Clemson from 1923 to 1926.

Early life and college career

A native of St. Joseph, Missouri,  Saunders graduated from the University of Missouri in 1911, in the field of law. He played football there as a quarterback on William Roper's 1909 team.  He was also a member of Phi Delta Theta during his time at Missouri.

Coaching career
Saunders began his coaching career in William Jewell College in Liberty, Missouri when he took charge of the football team in October 1911.  He had been slated to coach football at Missouri Valley College that year, but the school disbanded their football team.  Saunders served briefly as a football coach at Knox College previous to his stint at Clemson.

Head coaching record

Football

Notes

References

External links

1884 births
Year of death missing
American football quarterbacks
Basketball coaches from Missouri
Clemson Tigers athletic directors
Clemson Tigers football coaches
Clemson Tigers men's basketball coaches
Grinnell Pioneers football coaches
Haskell Indian Nations Fighting Indians football coaches
Knox Prairie Fire football coaches
Knox Prairie Fire men's basketball coaches
Missouri S&T Miners football coaches
Missouri Tigers baseball players
Missouri Tigers football players
William Jewell Cardinals football coaches
Sportspeople from St. Joseph, Missouri